Karamchedu is a village in Bapatla district of the Indian state of Andhra Pradesh. It is also the headquarters of Karamchedu mandal in Chirala revenue division.

There are seven villages under Karamchedu mandal:

See also
Karamchedu massacre

References

Villages in Prakasam district
Mandal headquarters in Prakasam district